Larry Williams (born Lawrence Eugene Williams, a.k.a. Lawrence Edward Williams; May 10, 1935 – January 7, 1980) was an American rhythm and blues and rock and roll singer, songwriter, producer, and pianist from New Orleans, Louisiana. Williams is best known for writing and recording some rock and roll classics from 1957 to 1959 for Specialty Records, including "Bony Moronie", "Short Fat Fannie", "Slow Down", "Dizzy, Miss Lizzy" (1958), "Bad Boy" and "She Said Yeah" (1959). John Lennon was a fan, and The Beatles and several other British Invasion groups recorded several of his songs.

Williams' life mixed tremendous success with violence and drug addiction. He was a longtime friend of Little Richard, with whom his life intertwined personally and professionally from their meeting in 1955 to Williams' death in 1980.

Early life
Born in New Orleans, Louisiana, on May 10, 1935, Williams moved west with his family early in his childhood. He spent some time with relatives in Chicago, Illinois, before relocating to Oakland, California in 1945.

Growing up in New Orleans, Williams learned to play piano as a boy. As a teen he joined a local R&B band in Oakland, Calif., when his parents relocated there. In 1954 he returned to New Orleans and began to work as a chauffeur/valet for singer Lloyd Price, eventually becoming pianist for Price as well as R&B singers Roy Brown and Percy Mayfield, who were all recording for Specialty Records. After establishing himself as a sideman, in 1957 Williams signed his own deal with Specialty, whose owners were hoping to help fill the gap that had just been left when their biggest star, Little Richard, left Rock and Roll for a (temporary) life in the ministry.

Career
Williams returned to New Orleans in 1954 and began working for his cousin, singer Lloyd Price, as a valet. He played in the bands of Price, Roy Brown, and Percy Mayfield. In 1955, Williams met and developed a friendship with Little Richard, who was recording at the time in New Orleans. Price and Little Richard were both recording for Specialty Records. He was introduced to Robert Blackwell, Specialty's house producer, and was signed to the label.

In 1957, Little Richard was Specialty's biggest star, but he left rock and roll to pursue the ministry. Williams quickly was groomed by Blackwell to try to replicate his success. Using the same raw, shouting vocals and piano-driven intensity, Williams scored with a number of hit singles.

Williams' three biggest successes were "Short Fat Fannie", which was his bestseller, reaching No. 5 in Billboard's pop chart, "Bony Moronie", which peaked at No. 14, and its flip "You Bug Me Baby" which made it to No. 45. "Short Fat Fannie" and "Bony Moronie" each sold over one million copies.

After 1957, Williams did not have much success selling records. He recorded a number of songs in 1958 and 1959, including "Dizzy, Miss Lizzy," which charted at No. 69 on Billboard's Pop chart in 1958. "Heebie Jeebies" was recorded with band members such as Plas Johnson on tenor saxophone and Jewel Grant on baritone, René Hall and Howard Roberts on guitars, Gerald Wilson on trumpet, Ernie Freeman or Williams himself on piano, and Earl Palmer on drums. After he was arrested for possession of narcotics and guns in 1959, he was dropped from Specialty. He recorded for Chess Records but no hits were produced. Williams then served a three-year jail term, setting back his career considerably.

Williams made a comeback in the mid-1960s with a funky soul band that included Johnny "Guitar" Watson, which paired him musically with Little Richard who had been lured back into secular music. He produced two of Little Richard's albums for Okeh Records in 1966 and 1967, which returned Little Richard to the Billboard album chart for the first time in 10 years and spawned the hit single "Poor Dog". He also acted as the music director for Little Richard's live performances at the Okeh Club. Bookings for Little Richard during this period skyrocketed.  Williams also recorded and released material of his own and with Watson, with some moderate chart success. "Too Late", the B-side of 1967 single "Two For The Price Of One" became one of the biggest songs on the Northern Soul scene in England, and remains prized due to its rarity as the single failed commercially.

Williams also began acting in the 1960s, appearing on film in Just for the Hell of It (1968), The Klansman (1974), and Drum (1976).

In the 1970s, he briefly was involved with disco music.

Personal life and demise

Williams' lifestyle involved recreational drug use and abuse which resulted in trouble with the law. By the middle of the 1970s, the drug abuse and violence were taking their toll. In 1977, Williams threatened Little Richard over a drug debt with a gun. However, he ended up showing compassion for his longtime friend. This, with other factors, led to Little Richard's return to born again Christianity and the ministry.

Williams was married to Ina Marie Williams, although they were eventually estranged.

On January 7, 1980, Williams was found dead by his mother at his home in Los Angeles, California from a gunshot wound to the head. He was 44 years old. His death was deemed suicide, though there was speculation that he was murdered because of his involvement in drugs and allegedly prostitution. No suspects were arrested or charged.  Williams was interred at Inglewood Park Cemetery, Inglewood, California.

Martin Albritton as Larry Williams
An Illinois drummer and blues singer named Martin Albritton claimed to be Larry Williams, alive and well. This claim originated at about the time Larry Williams was found dead. He recorded and performed as a drummer for Bobby "Blue" Bland in the 1960s.  Albritton toured the country performing under the moniker of "Big" Larry Williams, and claimed that he recorded the hits "Bony Moronie" and "Dizzy Miss Lizzy." He recorded an album in 1990 called Street Party with the Mellow Fellows, previously headed by Big Twist (né Lawrence Millard Nolan; 1937–1990). While touring with the Mellow Fellows in Chicago, Allbritton was confronted by singer Etta James, who knew the real Williams.

Williams' family asked Allbritton to cease billing himself as "Larry Williams". Allbritton died on August 24, 2017.

Legacy
Several of Williams' songs achieved success as revivals, by The Beatles ("Bad Boy", "Slow Down", and "Dizzy, Miss Lizzy"), The Rolling Stones ("She Said Yeah") and John Lennon ("Bony Moronie" and "Dizzy, Miss Lizzy").

Williams was posthumously inducted into the Louisiana Music Hall of Fame in 2014.

Discography

Albums
Here's Larry Williams - 1959 (Specialty Records)
Slow Down With Larry Williams (The Missing And Unissued Sides) - 1960 (Specialty Records)
Larry Williams On Stage! Recorded Live - 1964 (Sue Records)
The Larry Williams Show featuring Johnny "Guitar" Watson - 1965 (Decca Records, UK)
Two For the Price of One (with Johnny "Guitar" Watson) - 1967 (Okeh Records)
Larry Williams' Greatest Hits - 1967 (Okeh Records - re-recordings of Specialty hits)
That Larry Williams: The Resurrection of Funk - 1978 (Fantasy Records)
Unreleased Larry Williams - 1986 (Specialty Records - never before released tracks)

Singles

References

External links
 Biography at Concordmusic.com
 Larry Williams discography
 

1935 births
1980 deaths
American rhythm and blues singers
American rock songwriters
American rock singers
Bell Records artists
Chess Records artists
Fantasy Records artists
Okeh Records artists
Smash Records artists
Specialty Records artists
Boise State University alumni
Musicians from New Orleans
Musicians from Oakland, California
Northern soul musicians
Rock and roll musicians
Singer-songwriters from Louisiana
Burials at Inglewood Park Cemetery
1980 suicides
Suicides by firearm in California
African-American male songwriters
20th-century African-American male singers
Singer-songwriters from California